Gregor Main (born July 5, 1989) is an American professional golfer.

Main was born in Berkeley, California. He played college golf at UCLA, turning pro after his junior year. He earned medalist honors qualifying for the 2011 U.S. Amateur.

Main qualified for the 2016 U.S. Open through sectional qualifying. After posting 66 at the morning round at the Olympic Club, Ocean Course and 68 at Lake Merced Golf Club for a cumulative 134, he finished T2 just behind Miguel Tabuena at 132.

Amateur wins (1)
2009 Southern Amateur

Source:

Professional wins
2016 Northern California Open

Results in major championships

CUT = missed the half-way cut
Note: Main only played in the U.S. Open.

References

External links

American male golfers
UCLA Bruins men's golfers
Golfers from California
1989 births
Living people